Franz Retz (sometimes Francis Retz) (13 September 1673 - 19 November 1750) was a Bohemian Jesuit, elected fifteenth Superior General of the Society of Jesus, which he governed from 7 March 1730 to 19 November 1750.

Formation
After joining the Jesuits at the young age of 16 (in 1689) and doing his noviciate, he studied at the Faculty of Philosophy (1692–94) and Faculty of Theology (1700–03) of University of Olomouc. He obtained the doctorate in philosophy (Olomouc, 1703) and theology (Prague, 1709) and seemed destined to teach the same subjects.

In Rome
He had hardly begun to do so when he was called to Rome (1711) to fill certain administrative post. Provincial of Bohemia (today's Czech Republic) (1718–20) and Rector of the large High School of Prague (1720–23) he was called to Rome in 1725 by the then Superior General Michelangelo Tamburini as his Assistant for the Central European affairs. At the death of Tamburini (1730) Retz, as Vicar General of the Society, called the General Congregation.

Superior General
The sixteenth General Congregation elected him Superior General. The vote was nearly unanimous (68 of 70). His able administration contributed much to the welfare of the Society; he obtained the canonization of St. John Francis Regis (1738) and used the example of the saint to promote missionary work in the rural areas.

Father Retz's generalate was perhaps the quietest in the history of the order. There were difficulties in Poland but the overseas missions developed as never before.  The Society kept growing steadily. At the time of his death, it was made of thirty-nine provinces, twenty-four houses of professed fathers, 669 colleges, sixty-one novitiates, 335 residences, 273 mission stations, 176 seminaries, and 22,589 members of whom 11,293 were priests.

References

Superiors General of the Society of Jesus
Czech Jesuits
1673 births
1750 deaths
Palacký University Olomouc alumni